was a tennis player from Japan.

Career
He played his first tournament in 1959 at the Asian Championships. In 1961 he won his first title at the Japan International Championships, then won the Japan National Championships the same year. At the 1962 Asian Games, in Jakarta, Ishiguro won a singles bronze medal.

Ishiguro had wins over Ingo Buding and Keith Carpenter in the 1963 Wimbledon Championships, to make the third round, where he lost to Jaidip Mukerjea in straight sets. The same year he then won the Japan International Championships for the second time.

He was a quarter-finalist at the Queen's Club Championships in 1964. En route he managed a surprise win over American Frank Froehling, who had been a finalist in the previous year's US Championships.

In 1965, Ishiguro became the first post-war Japanese player to win a match at the Australian Championships, defeating Colin Stubs in the first round. He then beat Jean-Noel Grinda to progress to the third round, but his run would end there, losing to second seed Fred Stolle. The same year year he won the All Japan Indoor Tennis Championships title in Tokyo, and the Manley Seaside Championships in Sydney.

Ishiguro was a gold medalist at the 1966 Asian Games, beating countryman Ichizo Konishi in the final. The same year he won the All Japan Indoor Tennis Championships for the second time.

He took part in 17 Davis Cup ties for Japan, from 1958 to 1966. He won 19 of his 38 matches, 15 of those in singles rubbers. He died on 9 November 2016 at the age of 80.

In 1972 he founded the Japan Professional Tennis Association and served as its first board chairman. In 1975 he played his last singles event at the Tokyo WCT.

Personal life
His son is the actor Ken Ishiguro.

References

1936 births
2016 deaths
Japanese male tennis players
Asian Games medalists in tennis
Tennis players at the 1958 Asian Games
Tennis players at the 1962 Asian Games
Tennis players at the 1966 Asian Games
Sportspeople from Nagasaki Prefecture
People from Nagasaki
Asian Games gold medalists for Japan
Asian Games bronze medalists for Japan
Medalists at the 1962 Asian Games
Medalists at the 1966 Asian Games
20th-century Japanese people
21st-century Japanese people